Samuel Beal (27 November 1825, in Devonport, Devon – 20 August 1889, in Greens Norton, Northamptonshire) was an Oriental scholar, and the first Englishman to translate directly from the Chinese the early records of Buddhism, thus illuminating Indian history.

Life and work

Samuel Beal was born in Devonport, Devon, and went to Kingswood School and Devonport. He graduated from Trinity College, Cambridge in 1847. He was the son of a Wesleyan minister, reverend William Beal; and brother of William Beal and Philip Beal who survived a shipwreck in Kenn Reef.

From 1848 to 1850 he was headmaster of Bramham College, Yorkshire. He was ordained deacon in 1850, and priest in the following year. 
After serving as curate at Brooke in Norfolk and Sopley in Hampshire, he applied for the office of naval chaplain, and was appointed to H.M.S. Sybille (1847) during the China War of 1856–58. He was chaplain to the Marine Artillery and later to Pembroke and Devonport dockyards 1873–77.

In 1857, he printed for private circulation a pamphlet showing that the Tycoon of Yedo (i.e. Tokugawa shōgun of Edo), with whom foreigners had made treaties, was not the real Emperor of Japan.

In 1861 he married Martha Ann Paris, 1836–81.

In September 1872 he was appointed to examine the Buddhist Chinese books in the India Office Library, London. Of the Chinese language books held by the library, Beale found 72 Buddhist compilations across 112 volumes. His research illustrated key philosophical differences between Indian and Chinese Buddhism. An example was the Chinese version of the Indian Mahāparinibbāṇa Sutta. Beale's exegesis of the Chinese narrative revealed a key doctrinal divergence from the Indian version, and therefore between Northern and Southern Asian Buddhism, namely that Nirvana is not the cessation of Being but its perfection.
  
He retired from the navy in 1877, when he was appointed Professor of Chinese at University College, London. He was Rector of Falstone, Northumberland 1877–80; Rector of Wark, Northumberland 1880–88; and of Greens Norton, Northamptonshire, 1888–89. He was awarded DCL (Durham) in 1885 "in recognition of the value of his researches into Chinese Buddhism."

Beale's reputation was established by his series of works which traced the travels of the Chinese Buddhists in India from the fifth to the seventh centuries AD, and by his books on Buddhism, which have become classics.

The Buddhist Tripitaka

In 1874, Beale requested a Japanese copy of the Chinese Buddhist Tripitaka, the sacred books of Chinese and Japanese Buddhists, from Japanese ambassador Iwakura Tomomi. The copy was deposited at the India Office Library in 1875. This was the first time that the work became available in the West.  Beal finished cataloging the books in June 1876.

Partial list of works 
 Travels of Fah-Hian and Sung-Yun, Buddhist pilgrims, from China to India (400 A.D. and 518 A.D.). (1869)
 The Catena of Buddhist Scriptures from the Chinese (1872)
 The Romantic Legend of Buddha (1876)
 Texts from the Buddhist Canon, Dhammapada (1878)
 Buddhism in China (1884)
 Si-Yu-Ki: Buddhist Records of the Western World, by Hiuen Tsiang. 2 vols. Translated by Samuel Beal. London. 1884. Reprint: Delhi. Oriental Books Reprint Corporation. 1969. (Includes The Travels of Sung-Yun and Fa-Hien).
 The Life of Hiuen-Tsiang. Translated from the Chinese of Shaman Hwui Li by Samuel Beal. London. 1911. Reprint Munshiram Manoharlal, New Delhi. 1973.

References

Attribution

External links 

 Xuanzang's Record of the Western Regions Book 1 from Buddhist Records of the Western World, by Hiuen Tsiang (Xuanzang)
 
 

1825 births
1889 deaths
English religious writers
Writers from Devonport, Plymouth
Alumni of Trinity College, Cambridge
Royal Navy officers
Chinese–English translators
Royal Navy personnel of the Second Opium War
Clergy from Plymouth, Devon
Royal Navy chaplains
Second Opium War chaplains
19th-century translators
Military personnel from Devonport, Plymouth